Mohammad Abdul Jabbar (10 February 1938 – 30 August 2017) was a Bangladeshi singer. "Tumi Ki Dekhechho Kobhu Jiboner Porajoy", "Salam Salam Hajar Salam" and "Joy Bangla, Banglar Joy" were three of his songs which made it to the top 20 all-time Bangla songs in 2006 survey by the BBC Bangla. He was awarded Ekushey Padak in 1980 and Independence Day Award in 1996 by the Government of Bangladesh.

Early life and career
Jabbar was born in Kushtia. He passed SSC in 1956. He first took music lesson from Muhammad Osman in Kushtia and later from Moksed Ali Shai, Lutfel Haque and Shibkumar Chatterjee in Kolkata. In 1958, lyricist Azizur Rahman helped Jabbar get listed as an artiste of the radio station. He debuted his playback singing career in 1962 with music director Robin Ghosh. In 1964, he was enlisted as a TV artiste.

In 1969, Jabbar founded a musical group Bangabandhu Shilpagosthi. On 25 March 1971, he crossed the border into India and gradually joined a host of artistes of the Swadhin Bangla Betar Kendra.

After the independence of Bangladesh, he started performing as a film playback singer.  In 2008, after a five-decade career of playback singing, he started working on his only album Kothay Amar Neel Doriya, which was released in 2017. The songs of the album are written by lyricist Md Amirul Islam and composed by Md Golam Sarwar  In the same year, he opened an album with songs on Father of the Nation Bangabandhu Sheikh Mujibur Rahman. The album remains unfinished as this great artiste fell ill seriously before giving voice to the song titled " Bangabandhu Dekhechi Tomay Dekhechi Muktijuddho " penned by lyricist Amirul Islam.

Jabbar served as the president of Bangladesh Sangskritik Parishad.

Personal life
Jabbar was married to Halima Jabbar. Together they had two sons and one daughter Mithun Jabbar, Jasmin Jabbar and  Babu Jabbar.

Awards
 Bangabandhu Padak (1973)
 Ekushey Padak (1980)
 Independence Day Award (1996)
 Bachsas Awards (2003)
  Citycell-Channel i Music Awards – Lifetime Achievement Award (2011)
 Zahir Raihan Chalachchitra Purashkar
 Mother Teresa Award

Film songs

List of selected songs

Musical albums

Songs of album Kothay Amar Neel Doriya

Death  
Jabbar was admitted to Bangabandhu Sheikh Mujib Medical University (BSMMU) on 1 August 2017  with kidney, cardiovascular, prostate and other ailments.  He was shifted to the Intensive Care Unit (ICU) as his health condition deteriorated. He died on 30 August 2017 at the ICU of the hospital while undergoing treatment.

References

1938 births
2017 deaths
People from Kushtia District
20th-century Bangladeshi male singers
20th-century Bangladeshi singers
Recipients of the Independence Day Award
Recipients of the Ekushey Padak
Burials at Mirpur Martyred Intellectual Graveyard
21st-century Bangladeshi male singers
21st-century Bangladeshi singers